Lygephila vulcanea is a moth of the family Erebidae first described by Arthur Gardiner Butler in 1881. It is found in Russia and Japan.

References

Moths described in 1881
Toxocampina